The University of Novi Sad is a public university in Novi Sad, Serbia. Alongside nationally prestigious University of Belgrade, University of Novi Sad is one of the most important educational and research institutions in Serbia and South Eastern Europe and the flagship institution of higher education in Vojvodina. It was attended by 42,489 students and it employed 3,219 members of academic staff in 2018–19 academic year. It is composed of 14 faculties and three institutes located in four university cities - Novi Sad, Sombor, Subotica and Zrenjanin. Institution belongs to the group of comprehensive research universities with significant level of research activities.

History
The University of Novi Sad was being caste in a special milieu built by generations of foremost intellectuals, as well as institutions of particular national significance, in the towns of Vojvodina with their duration being measured in centuries. In today's Autonomous Province of Vojvodina, and Serbia as a whole, the roots of higher education were laid around 1740, with the establishment of the seminary named Collegium Vissariono-Pawlovicsianum Petrovaradinense in Novi Sad. Among the most prominent forerunners of the University of Novi Sad were Norma - school for the education of Serbian teachers, founded in Sombor in 1778, and Preparandija, a teachers' college founded in 1812 in Szentendre, whose seat moved to Sombor in 1816.

The most significant role in the development of scientific thought from the 19th century onwards is held by Matica Srpska, the oldest cultural and scientific institution of the Serbian people, founded in 1826 in Pest, whose seat was relocated to Novi Sad in 1864. The development of legal sciences and education on the territory of today's Vojvodina was especially influenced by the Faculty of Law in Subotica, established in 1920.

The great synthesis of aspirations, visions, ideas and achievements in the field of science and education took place in 1960, when the National Assembly adopted the Law on establishment of the University of Novi Sad, which brought together previously founded faculties into a unique academic community of Novi Sad.

Organization

Faculties and Institutes
The faculties and institutes of the University of Novi Sad are situated in four historic cities of the Autonomous Province of Vojvodina, in the north of the Republic of Serbia. The seat of the university is in Novi Sad, with the central campus situated on the bank of the river Danube, in the vicinity of Petrovaradin Fortress (built in the 18th century), and the old city center.

As of 2018–19 school year, a total of nine faculties are located in Novi Sad, three in Subotica and one each in Sombor and Zrenjanin. The faculties of the University of Kragujevac with data about location, academic staff and number of students as of 2018–19 school year:

Studies
The University of Novi Sad offers around 400 accredited study programs at the level of Bachelor, Master, Specialist and Doctoral studies, carried out at its faculties and within its Centers for Interdisciplinary and Multidisciplinary Studies. Along with the Faculties and Centers, three Scientific Institutes have a significant role in creating a solid scientific base for the process of continuous modernization of the educational offer.

About 56% of students at all study levels studies are women. In 2017–18 school year, a total of 6,794 students have graduated at the university.

Science
The University of Novi Sad has a well-developed research infrastructure and great potential for innovation. The Central Library and the faculties' and institute libraries offer a rich array of publications that cover all relevant scientific areas and enable access to large electronic databases. Resulting from a special agreement on cooperation, researchers, professors and students have access to the Matica Srpska Library, the oldest Serbian scientific and cultural institution, founded in 1826, which offers more than three million publications.

The university encompasses around 250 laboratories. Of special significance to the strengthening of inventiveness is the Technology Park of the University of Novi Sad. With the support of the Faculty of Technical Sciences, around 140 start-up and spin-off companies have been founded, mainly in the IT sector, employing young engineers who graduated from the University of Novi Sad. Some of these companies implement projects for large international corporations and have contributed to Novi Sad becoming recognized internationally as a "Software Valley". Project teams and prominent researchers from the University of Novi Sad have been the recipients of numerous international and national awards for the best technical innovations. There are several accredited centers of excellence at the University of Novi Sad. The BioSense Institute, formed within the Faculty of Technical Sciences, was proclaimed by the European Union as one of the thirty research institutions in Europe with the greatest potential in the field of bio-technologies. Its project ANTARES was the best ranked in Europe in 2016 within the program Horizon 2020.

Students of the University of Novi Sad achieve impressive results in a number of fields. The teams of the Faculty of Law have been among the best in Europe for decades. In 2009, they won the first place in the moot court competition, which was organized by the University of Leiden at the International Court of Justice in the Hague. They have accomplished similar success, on a global scale in 2016. The students from the Faculty of Technical Sciences, which continue the tradition of the famous Yugoslav School of Robotics, have also been among the best in Europe. They won the second and the third places in Paris in 2016 at the contest organized by EUROBOT. The students of the Academy of Arts and the Faculty of Sports and Physical Education acquire numerous awards at national and international competitions.

Art

The Academy of Arts Novi Sad was founded in 1974 as one of the University of Novi Sad faculties. Today the Academy of Arts offers accredited programs at the level of Bachelor, Master, and Doctoral studies, carried out by the Department of Music, Department of Fine Arts, and Dramatic Arts.

Along with its educational and scientific activities, the academy is famous for developing international cooperation with numerous cultural, artistic, and academic institutions. The academy's strength is based on its capacity to develop international projects through various programs such as Erasmus +, Creative Europe, and Horizon 2020.

The Academic Culture and Art Society of the University of Novi Sad "Sonja Marinković" is known for its successful performances at festivals in the country and abroad. Its Accordion Orchestra won the 1st prize at the World Music Competition in Innsbruck (Austria) in 2013 and is considered to be one of the best in Europe.

Specialized student services
Students of the University of Novi Sad have at their disposal specialized services that provide healthcare, accommodation and food. Medical services are provided by the "Institute for Student Healthcare", which comprises units for specialist medical care, counseling and laboratory diagnostics.  The accommodation and food is provided by the "Student Center". The level of services that are provided is in accordance with the standards adopted in developed European countries.

Notable alumni

 Poets and novelists Dragomir Dujmov, Mihajlo Kažić and Jovan Zivlak, 
 American Slavist Wayles Browne,
 Bulgarian linguist Lyubomir Miletich, 
 Croatian-American writer Josip Novakovich, 
 Serbian-Canadian mathematician and computer scientist Ivan Stojmenovic.
 Serbian Ambassador to Israel Mile Isakov, and 
 Hungarian politicians in Serbia Attila Juhász and István Pásztor.

Among the best-known musicians are:
 pianists Rita Kinka, Mladen Čolić and Ratimir Martinović, 
 flutist Sanja Stijačić, 
 composer Mitar Subotić,

Notable people
 

 Dorian Leljak, pianist and university professor

See also
 Education in Serbia
 List of universities in Serbia

References

External links

 

 
University of Novi Sad
Education in Novi Sad
Educational institutions established in 1960
1960 establishments in Yugoslavia